Herbert Clarke may refer to:
Herbert Clarke (skater) (1879–1956), British figure skater
Herbert L. Clarke (1867–1945), American cornet player
Herbert Clarke, railway guard in 1944 Soham rail disaster in England
Herb Clarke (1887–1938), Canadian ice hockey player
Herb Clarke (weatherman) (1927–2012), American TV-journalist

See also
Herbert Clark (disambiguation)